Cannons Creek may refer to:

Cannons Creek, Victoria, a coastal village in Australia
Cannons Creek, New Zealand, a suburb of Porirua, New Zealand
Cannons Creek Independent School, an independent school in Pinelands, Cape Town, South Africa

See also
 Cannon Creek Lake, reservoir in Kentucky
 Cannon (disambiguation)